Triplophysa zhaoi is a species of ray-finned fish in the genus Triplophysa. It grows to  SL. It is endemic to China and inhabits swampy creeks.

References

Z
Freshwater fish of China
Endemic fauna of China
Taxa named by Artem Mikhailovich Prokofiev
Fish described in 2006